Paul Kersey (born February 10, 1970) is an American actor.  He starred opposite Ning Jing in the Feng Xiaoning films Red River Valley (1997) and Lover's Grief over the Yellow River (1999).  Kersey also portrayed the younger version of David Banner in Hulk (2003).  On television, he played the son of James Coburn's character in Missing Pieces (2000).
He has quit being an actor and will not return to any other shows. He lives now in Ada, Minnesota.

References

External links

1970 births
20th-century American male actors
21st-century American male actors
Living people
American male film actors
American male television actors
Male actors from Minnesota
People from Ada, Minnesota